State Route 261 is a state highway located entirely within south-central San Juan County, Utah.

The highway is part of the Utah section of the Trail of the Ancients, a National Scenic Byway.  It includes steep switchbacks as it traverses the Moki Dugway.

Route description
From its southern terminus north of Mexican Hat, SR-261 commences in a westerly direction. After turning north, the route encounters the Moki Dugway, becoming an unpaved road for its ascent up onto Cedar Mesa, only to return to being paved for the rest of the route to its terminus at SR-95 just east of Natural Bridges National Monument.

History
The Moki Dugway was constructed in 1958 by Texas Zinc, a mining company, to transport uranium ore from the "Happy Jack" mine in Fry Canyon to the processing mill in Mexican Hat. The State Road Commission added SR-261 to the state highway system in 1957, following its present alignment from SR-47 (now US-163) north of Mexican Hat to SR-95.

Major intersections

References

External links

261
261
 261